Rakovnik is a small settlement in the Municipality of Šentjernej in southeastern Slovenia. It lies in the foothills of the Gorjanci range. The entire municipality is part of the traditional region of Lower Carniola. It is now included in the Southeast Slovenia Statistical Region.

There is a small church in the forest south of the settlement. It is dedicated to Our Lady of Lourdes with a statue of Mary placed in a niche carved into the rockface and a building erected in front of it. It dates to the early 20th century.

References

External links
Rakovnik on Geopedia

Populated places in the Municipality of Šentjernej